Olympig Games (a spoof of Olympic Games), is an adventure story arc of the Philippine comic strip series Pugad Baboy, created by Pol Medina Jr. and originally published in the Philippine Daily Inquirer. This particular story arc lasts 19 strips long. In 1994, the story arc was reprinted in PB5, the fifth book compilation of the comic strip series.

Synopsis
The story arc begins with Polgas using a slingshot to light the Olympig flame. Brosia and Tiny serve as commentators, though only the former does all the work since the latter does nothing but eat during the whole event. They proudly announce the composition of the teams participating in the games:

 The Lomo Team, from Lumo street - Senator Cabalfin, Mao, Pao and Ka Noli.
 The Pata Team, from Pata street - Sgt. Tomas and his wife, Barbie, Bab and Doc Sebo.
 The Scream Team, from Liempo street - Polgas, Dagul, Tata Mads and Joboy.

The Patintero event
The Lumo team square off against the Scream Team which is ahead by a point. Mao uses his special Ngyaopao siopao to distract Joboy; Ka Noli is able to get through the opposing team's defense. This ties the score. The Lumo team continues employing distracting techniques to score against their opponents. Pao eats camias in front of Doc Sebo, who lets Ka Noli score a point. The Pata team then employs intimidation techniques to counter the strategy being used by Lumo team. Tomas tells Mao to let him pass if he wants his business license renewed. He even hints that he might report Mao as an illegal alien to the Bureau of Immigration. However, Mao reminds him that Senator Cabalfin is his team-mate. Tomas gives up.

Results: Patintero event 
 Gold - Lomo Team
 Silver - Pata Team
 Bronze - Scream Team

The Gagamba match
Ka Noli, Barbie and Joboy represent their respective teams in the Spider fighting event. They showcase the different spider breeds in their possession, including a ninja spider, complete with ninja suit, mask and katana. In one of the matches, Noli and Joboy's spiders grappled into a ball characteristic of fighting spiders locked in combat. However, both spiders suddenly fell off the stick, totally spent. This surprises the contestants and the Olympig Committee scrutinizes the arachnids. It was discovered that one of the spiders was female - the spiders had not been fighting, they had been mating. Lumo Team's spider seemed to be the gold medal winner, but it was disqualified after testing positive for performance-enhancing drugs.

Results: Gagamba match 
 Gold - Scream Team
 Silver - Pata Team
 Bronze - none (Lumo Team disqualified)

The Tex tournament
The teams show off their ace cards in the Tex tournament: Scream Team has a Bitch Na Bitch Kita: Ang Utol Kong Doberman Part 2 card, a spoof of the Philippine film Miss Na Miss Kita: Ang Utol Kong Hoodlum Part 2, released in 1992. Lumo Team displays a Tuta Ni Baby Aso card, spoofing another Philippine film - Anak Ni Baby Ama, released in 1990. Pata Team has a Barkman Returns card, a spoof of the Hollywood film Batman Returns. The contestants then try to employ all sorts of strategies to win the tournament, including blowing at the cards while these are in mid-air after the toss.

Results: Tex tournament 
 Gold - Pata Team

The Holen tournament
The holen tournament sees the continued use of intimidation techniques by the contestants, especially Tomas and Ka Noli, who openly display their firearms while playing with marbles. To counter this, Dagul uses a different strategy - he sticks adhesive labels proclaiming gun ownership to the rear windshield of his car, to appear as if he also owned guns when in fact, he didn't.

A special attraction in the holen tournament was the "Slam-dyols Competition", where contestants performed a series of athletic and acrobatic maneuvers before slamming home a marble into the hole in the ground. Pao's routine consists of an out-of-water tumble turn, a 360° spin, and what seems to be a reverse pike or split. Bab's routine begins with an all-out rush accelerating him to full speed. He then performs a high leap but Senator Cabalfin trips him up. The resulting triple somersault ends with Bab's face buried in the dirt. Polgas takes his turn. His routine begins in a similar manner to Bab's - a full gallop. He then performs a double somersault with a full twist. Upon landing on the ground, he burrows under for some distance, explosively emerges and slams home the marble. The judges extremely liked his routine; it appeared that he would take gold. However, as Tomas and Barbie were arguing in the stands, Barbie gave Tomas an uppercut that almost sent him into orbit. Upon reaching the apex of his flight, Tomas came crashing back down to earth, ending with half his torso buried head-first in the dirt. This was considered as Lumo Team's second slam-dyols routine called the Skywalk Dyols - and Pata Team took the gold medal.

Results: Holen tournament and Slam-dyols competition 
 Gold - Pata Team

Epilogue
At the conclusion of the holen tournament, someone threw a marble at Senator Cabalfin, hitting him in the head. The good Senator retaliated - at an innocent Tomas. This precipitated a melee of marble-throwing that had the entire Boarselona Stadium thundering with applause. The Olympig Committee thus decided to include marble-throwing as an event in the next Olympig games. As the games wrapped up, Tomas and Noli were in-charge of the fireworks - using their firearms, of course. All the teams had their share of gold, silver and bronze medals. In addition, Scream Team was also handed throat pastilles by the Olympig Committee, as the members were all hoarse from screaming during the games.

Barcelona Olympics Connection
 The setting is declared by Medina to be the Boarselona Stadium, a play on Barcelona, Spain. 
 Polgas' way of lighting the cauldron by using a slingshot and a dangling bottle of flammable liquid is reminiscent of archer Antonio Rebollo's way of lighting the cauldron in the 1992 Games opening ceremonies.
 The logo used for the Olympigs, aside from the five rings infused with pig snouts, is an abstract representation of a running pig, similar to the logo of the 1992 Summer Olympics. 
 The Scream Team also honors the American Dream Team.

Pugad Baboy